Peter Brown (ca. 1797 – December 28, 1845 in Harbour Grace, Newfoundland) was a merchant, politician and justice of the peace was elected to the House of Assembly representing the district of Conception Bay on the first general election held in Newfoundland in 1832.

Brown, born in Ireland immigrated to Newfoundland where he was a dealer and shopkeeper in the Conception Bay area. He was a strong supporter of John Kent and remained in politics until 1842.

See also
List of people of Newfoundland and Labrador

References

1790s births
1845 deaths
Members of the Newfoundland and Labrador House of Assembly
People from Harbour Grace
Year of birth uncertain
Newfoundland Colony people
Irish emigrants to pre-Confederation Newfoundland